Daniele Cioni (5 April 1959 – 6 May 2021) was an Italian sport shooter who competed in the 1984 Summer Olympics, in the 1988 Summer Olympics, and in the 1992 Summer Olympics.

Biography
Cioni won 18 medals (8 gold) at individual senior and junior level in the international championships and World Cup. His first great success was in 1982 when he was team world champion, individual bronze in Caracas, Venezuela and world record equaled in Montecatini, where he won the individual European title on the occasion and is team silver.

Achievements

See also
Trap World Champions
Double trap World Champions

References

External links
 
 Daniele Cioni at AMOVA

1959 births
2021 deaths
Italian male sport shooters
Trap and double trap shooters
Olympic shooters of Italy
People from Campi Bisenzio
Shooters at the 1984 Summer Olympics
Shooters at the 1988 Summer Olympics
Shooters at the 1992 Summer Olympics
Deaths from the COVID-19 pandemic in Tuscany
Sportspeople from the Metropolitan City of Florence